Nannostomus minimus, (from the Greek: nanos = small, and the Latin stoma = relating to the mouth; from the Latin: minimus = of the smallest size), commonly known as the least pencilfish, is a freshwater species of fish belonging to the characin family Lebiasinidae. It is restricted to Guyana, where it has been reported from the Potaro and Mazaruni Rivers.

N. minimus reaches a length of 23 mm. When described in 1909, it was the smallest of the known pencilfishes; that distinction has since passed to N. anduzei.

References
 
                                                                                                                                     

Lebiasinidae
Taxa named by Carl H. Eigenmann
Fish described in 1909
Fish of South America
Fish of the Amazon basin